A perennial stream is a stream that has continuous flow of surface water throughout the year in at least parts of its catchment during seasons of normal rainfall, as opposed to one whose flow is intermittent. In the absence of irregular, prolonged or extreme drought, a perennial stream is a watercourse, or segment, element or emerging body of water which continually delivers groundwater. For example, an artificial disruption of stream, variability in flow or stream selection associated with the activity in hydropower installations, do not affect this status. Perennial streams do not include stagnant water (pools and waterholes), reservoirs, cutoff lakes and ponds that persist throughout the year. All other streams, or parts of them, should be considered seasonal rivers or lakes. The stream can cycle from intermittent to perpetual through multiple iterations.

Stream

Definition 

The basic concept means flowing bodies of water. In hydrology, the stream usually refers to water flowing through natural passages separated from canals.

The flow is the main component of the drainage of surface water through the bed of the river and the bank of the river. The flows are regulated by three aspects: surface water, subsurface flow, and groundwater. During the rainy seasons, surface and subsurface water differ greatly. Groundwater is reasonably stable and regulated by trends of long-term precipitation.  The patterns include surface, subsurface, and groundwater. And these factors flow into geological, geomorphological, hydrological, and biological controls.

Classification 
The following can be listed as streams in natural channels :

According to the time:

 Perennial: The one which flows continuously.
 Intermittent or seasonal: it occurs only in a certain time of the year when it receives ample water from springs or other ground source in mountainous areas, such as mountain snow melting. 
 Ephemeral: One that only flows in direct reaction to rainfall, and whose channel is always above the water table.

According to space:

 Continuous: One which has no spatial interruptions.
 Interrupted: The one with alternative arrivals. They are sporadic, permanent, or low.

According to the water underneath:

 Gaining: A stream or path to receive water from groundwater.
 Losing: A stream or reach of a stream which shows a net loss of water to groundwater or evaporation. 
 Isolated: The water flow or channel shall not supply or remove water from the saturated region.
 Perched:  refers to the loss or isolation flow separated from the groundwater in the air zone. Classification

Importance 

Streams, headwaters, and streams flowing only part of the year provide many benefits upstream and downstream. They defend against floods, remove contaminants, recycle nutrients that are potentially dangerous as well as provide food and habitat for many forms of fish. Such streams also play a vital role in preserving our drinking water quality and supply, ensuring a steady flow of water to surface waters and helping to restore deep aquifers.
Clean drinking water
Flood and erosion protection
Groundwater recharge
Pollution reduction
Wildlife habitat
Economic importance in fishing, hunting, manufacturing and agriculture.

Etymology 
The word "perennial" from the 1640s, meaning "evergreen," is established in Latin perennis, keeping the meaning as "everlasting all year round," per "over" plus annus "year." This has been proved since the 1670s by the "living years" in the sense of botany. The metaphorical sense of "enduring, eternal" originates from 1750. They are related to "perennial." See biennial for shifts in vowels.

Difference between perennial stream and intermittent stream

Characteristics 
Perennial streams have one or more of these characteristics:

 Direct observation or compelling evidence suggests that there is no interruption in the flow at ground.
 The existence of one or more specific features of the  perennial streams, including:
 Riverbed forms, for example, riffles, pools, runs, gravel bars, other depositional characteristics, bed armor layer.
 Riverbank erosion and/or polishment.
 Indications of waterborne debris and sediment transport.
 Defined river or stream bed and banks.
 The catchment area exceeds .
 USGS regression on the VHD data layer-oriented application on the probability of intermittent flow.
 The existence of aquatic organisms that require uninterrupted circulation.
 As shown by bank leakage, spring, or other indicators, grass-roots flow mainly supports groundwater recharge.
 There are high channels of permeability, especially stratospheric, boundary conditions; while stratospheric groundwater also decreases on occasion.
 Existence of native aquatic organisms which require undisturbed survival flow.
 The surrounding topography exhibits features of being formed by fluvial processes.

Absence of such characteristics supports classifying a stream as intermittent, "showing interruptions in time or space".

Sources
The streams typically derive most of their water from rain and snow precipitation. Most of this water re-enters the atmosphere either by evaporation from soil and water bodies, or by plant evapotranspiration. By infiltration some of the water sinks into the earth and becomes groundwater, much of which eventually enters streams. Most precipitated water is partially bottled up by evaporation or freezing in snow fields and glaciers. The majority of the water flows as a runoff from the ground; the proportion of this varies depending on several factors, such as climate, temperature, vegetation, types of rock, and relief. This runoff begins as a thin layer called sheet wash, combined with a network of tiny rills, which together form the sheet runoff; when this water is focused in a channel, a stream is born. Some rivers and streams may begin from lakes or ponds.

Freshwater's primary sources are precipitation and mountain snowmelt. However, rivers typically originate in the highlands, and are slowly created by the erosion of mountain snowmelt into lakes or rivers. Rivers usually flow from their source topographically, and erode as they pass until they reach the base stage of erosion.

The scientists have offered a way based on data to define the origin of the lake. A classified sample was the one measured by the Chinese researchers from the University of Chinese Academy of Sciences.

As an essential symbol of the river formation environment, the river source needs an objective and straightforward and effective method of judging. A calculation model of river source catchment area based on critical support flow (CSD) proposed, and the relationship between CSA and CSD with a minimum catchment area established. At the same time, the white water curvature is 0.0085 m3/s. Besides, the critical support flow can vary with hydrologic climate conditions, and the vital support flow Qc in wet areas (white water) is larger than in semi-arid regions (heap slot). The proposed critical support flow (CSD) concept and model method can be used to determine the hydrographic indicators of river sources in complex geographical areas, and it can also reflect the impact of hydrologic climate change on river recharge in different regions.

The source of a river or stream (its point of origin) can consist of lakes, swamps, springs, or glaciers. A typical river has several tributaries; each of these may be made up of several other smaller tributaries, so that together this stream and all its tributaries are called a drainage network. Although each tributary has its own source, international practice is to take the source farthest from the river mouth as the source of the entire river system, from which the most extended length of the river measured as the starting point is taken as the length of the whole river system, and that furthest starting point is conventionally taken as the source of the whole river system. For example, the origin of the Nile River is the confluence of the White Nile and the Blue Nile, but the source of the whole river system is in its upper reaches. If there is no specific designation, "length of the Nile" refers to the "river length of the Nile system", rather than to the length of the Nile river from the point where it is formed by a confluence of tributaries. The Nile's source is often cited as Lake Victoria, but the lake has significant feeder rivers. The Kagera River, which flows into Lake Victoria near Bukoba's Tanzanian town, is the longest feeder, though sources do not agree on which is the Kagera's longest tributary and therefore the Nile's most remote source itself.

Indicators of a perennial stream

Benthic macroinvertebrates 
"Macroinvertebrate" refers to easily seen invertebrates, larger than 0.5 mm, found in stream and river bottoms. Macroinvertebrates are larval stages of most aquatic insects and their presence is a good indicator that the stream is perennial. Larvae of caddisflies, mayflies, stoneflies, and damselflies require a continuous aquatic habitat until they reach maturity. Crayfish and other crustaceans, snails, bivalves (clams), and aquatic worms also indicate the stream is perennial. These require a persistent aquatic environment for survival.

Vertebrates 
Fish and amphibians are secondary indicators in assessment of a perennial stream because some fish and amphibians can inhabit areas without persistent water regime. When assessing for fish, all available habitat should be assessed: pools, riffles, root clumps and other obstructions. Fish will seek cover if alerted to human presence, but should be easily observed in perennial streams. Amphibians also indicate a perennial stream and include tadpoles, frogs, salamanders, and newts. These amphibians can be found in stream channels, along stream banks, and even under rocks. Frogs and tadpoles usually inhabit shallow and slow moving waters near the sides of stream banks. Frogs will typically jump into water when alerted to human presence.

Geological indicators 
Well defined river beds composed of riffles, pools, runs, gravel bars, a bed armor layer, and other depositional features, plus well defined banks due to bank erosion, are good identifiers when assessing for perennial streams. Particle size will help identify a perennial stream. Perennial streams cut through the soil profile, which removes fine and small particles. By assessing areas for relatively coarse material left behind in the stream bed and finer sediments along the side of the stream or within the floodplain will be a good indicator of persistent water regime.

Hydrological indicators 
A perennial stream can be identified 48 hours after a storm.  Direct storm runoff usually has ceased at this point.  If a stream is still flowing and contributing inflow is not observed above the channel, the observed water is likely baseflow. Another perennial stream indication is an abundance of red rust material in a slow-moving wetted channel or stagnant area.  This is evidence that iron-oxidizing bacteria are present, indicating persistent expression of oxygen-depleted ground water. In a forested area, leaf and needle litter in the stream channel is an additional indicator. Accumulation of leaf litter does not occur in perennial streams since such material is continuously flushed. In the adjacent overbank of a perennial stream, fine sediment may cling to riparian plant stems and tree trunks. Organic debris drift lines or piles may be found within the active overbank area after recent high flow.

See also
 Winterbourne, a stream that flows only in winter
 River ecosystem

References

More references:

 Nile Basin Initiative. 2011. Archived from the original on 2 September 2010. Retrieved 1 February 2011.
 Telegraph. Archived from the original on 3 May 2012. Retrieved 6 September 2012. Journey to the source of the Nile.
 Cheng Haining, Liu Shaoyuan. Discussion on criteria for the determination of sources of large rivers [J]. Qinghai Land Survey 2009, 06:24–28.
 Li, Zhouyuan; Liu, Xuehua; Niu, Tianlin; Kejia, De; Zhou, Qingping; et al. Environmental science & technology Vol. 49, Iss. 10,  (May 19, 2015): 5897–5904. DOI:10.1021/es505985q
 "A Citizen's Primer on Stream Ecology, Water Quality, Hydrology, and Fluvial Geomorphology-Volume II" (PDF).

Bodies of water
Rivers